Crosthwaite and Lyth is a civil parish in the South Lakeland District of Cumbria, England.  It contains 38 listed buildings that are recorded in the National Heritage List for England.  Of these, one is listed at Grade II*, the middle of the three grades, and the others are at Grade II, the lowest grade.  The parish is in the Lake District National Park.  It contains the villages and smaller settlements of Crosthwaite, Crosthwaite Green and Rowe, and is otherwise rural.  Most of the listed buildings are houses and associated structures, farmhouses and farm buildings.  The other listed buildings include bridges, limekilns, a corn mill and ancillary buildings, a former school, a mill dam and associated structures, and a church.


Key

Buildings

References

Citations

Sources

Lists of listed buildings in Cumbria